Elena Cué (born 1972) is a Spanish businesswoman, art expert and writer. She studied philosophy and publishes articles, and interviews world renown artists for the Spanish newspaper ABC, as well as for the US version of the Huffington Post.

Elena is the president of the Alberto and Elena Cortina Foundation, dedicated to social works. She manages the foundation together with her husband, the businessman Alberto Cortina. In October 1997, she won the Spanish shooting championship.

Relationship with art 
Elena founded the web Alejandra de Argos, where she writes articles about art and interviews influential and world renowned artists such as Jeff Koons, the Colombian Fernando Botero or her friend Cai Guo-Qiang, as well as Nobel Prize in Literature laureate, Mario Vargas Llosa. In addition to the articles in her website, Elena writes for the Spanish newspaper ABC and at the US edition of the Huffington Post. In November 2015 Elena joined the patronage for the  Museo Reina Sofía foundation and in June 2016 she joined the patronage of the ABC Museum of Madrid. Elena is a member of Vivre en couleur of the Fondation Cartier pour l'Art Contemporain.

Notable Interviews 

 October 2014 Cai Guo-Qiang.
 November 2014 Yue Minjun.
 November 2014 Maurizio Cattelan.
 December 2014 Guillermo Kuitca.
 January 2015 Miquel Barceló.
 February 2015 Fernando Botero.
 March 2015 Yan Pei-Ming.
 April 2015 Thomas Struth.
 May 2015 Jean Nouvel.
 June 2015 Joana Vasconcelos.
 June 2015 Martín Chirino.
 June 2015 Bernard Kouchner.
 October 2015 Jason deCaires Taylor.
 November 2015 Tatiana Trouvé.
 December 2015 Hiroshi Sugimoto.
 December 2015 Eduardo Arroyo.
 January 2016 Candida Höfer.
 March 2016 Mario Vargas Llosa.
 June 2016 Jeff Koons.
 March 2019 Bernard-Henri Lévy.
 June 2019 Jack Ma.
December 2019 Al Gore.

Charitable Foundation 
In 2011, Elena Cué and Alberto Cortina created the Alberto and Elena Cortina Foundation with the stated purpose to promote, create, develop and aid individuals and projects with all kinds of charity and education aims, and with a special focus on children. The foundation started with various projects in parallel. In 2011 it helped the victims of the 2010 Haiti earthquake by distributing food aid during that year and by reconstructing homes and other infrastructures. The foundation also provides help to woman at risk of Social exclusion, free housing and a soup kitchen. In 2012 the foundation started the invisible kitchen service, through it food and other basic supplies are distributed to families in need at their own homes. Another project promoted Elena's foundation is the "Econosolidario", the only grocery store in Spain where the families designated by social services can use a card that holds points to "buy" the basic products they need.

Personal life
In 1997, Elena Cué started a relationship with the businessman Alberto Cortina. They were married in 2000 at Cortina's estate "Las Cuevas". In 2006 their daughter Alejandra Cortina Cué was born.

References

External links 
Alberto and Elena Cortina Foundation
Alejandra de Argos

Art writers
Living people
1972 births
Spanish businesspeople
Spanish female sport shooters